A hospital trust, also known as an acute trust, is an NHS trust that provides secondary health services within the English National Health Service and, until they were abolished, in NHS Wales. Hospital trusts were commissioned to provide these services by NHS primary care trusts and now by clinical commissioning groups. NHS trusts were established by the National Health Service and Community Care Act 1990 as the first step in setting up an internal market.

NHS foundation trusts were regulated by Monitor until 2016, when it was merged with the NHS Trust Development Authority to form NHS Improvement. As of January 2014, there were 59 NHS hospital trusts, out of the total of 97 NHS trusts supervised by the TDA.

See also
List of NHS trusts
List of hospitals in England
List of hospitals in Wales
:Category:NHS hospital trusts

References

National Health Service (England)